Netherlands competed at the 2013 World Championships in Athletics in Moscow, Russia, from 10–18 August 2013.
A team of 23 athlete was announced to represent the country in the event.

Dafne Schippers won with her bronze in the women's heptathlon the first women's medal for the Netherlands at the World Championships in Athletics in history.

Medallists
The following Dutch competitors won medals at the Championships

Results
(q – qualified, NM – no mark, SB – season best)

Men
Track and road events

Field events

Decathlon

Women
Track and road events

Heptathlon

See also
Netherlands at other World Championships in 2013
 Netherlands at the 2013 UCI Road World Championships
 Netherlands at the 2013 World Aquatics Championships

References

External links
IAAF World Championships – Netherlands

Nations at the 2013 World Championships in Athletics
World Championships in Athletics
Netherlands at the World Championships in Athletics